Friedrichsfeld is a railway station in Friedrichsfeld, part of Voerde, North Rhine-Westphalia, Germany. The station is located on the Arnhem-Oberhausen railway. The train services are operated by Deutsche Bahn and Abellio Deutschland.

History
The station appears to have been opened sometime between 1880 and 1886 on the Oberhausen–Arnhem line, which was opened by the Cologne-Minden Railway Company (Cöln-Mindener Eisenbahn-Gesellschaft, CME) on 20 October 1856. It was opened under the name of Friedrichsfeld, but it was renamed Friedrichsfeld (Niederrh) between 1927 and 1936.

Transport services
Friedrichsfeld station is served (as of 2020) by the following lines (the Wupper-Lippe-Express operates on weekdays only):

Buses
It is also served by three bus routes operated by NIAG:
 16 (Friedrichsfeld – Heidesiedlung/Oberemmelsum), 5 times a day
 25 (Friedrichsfeld – Möllen - Dinslaken - Hiesfeld), every 60 minutes
 81 (Wesel – Friedrichsfeld – Spellen – Löhnen – Voerde) at 30 to 60 minute intervals

It is also served by bus route 80 (to Wesel and Hünxe) operated by rvn at 60 to 120 minute intervals:

See also

 List of railway stations in North Rhine-Westphalia

Notes

External links
NIAG Website 

Railway stations in North Rhine-Westphalia
Railway stations in Germany opened in 2020